From the Beginning is the first compilation album by the English rock band Small Faces. It was released by Decca Records of group material after the band had left the record label; it consisted of the band's Decca hit singles combined with various unreleased recordings.   The album rose to Number 17 in the UK Album Chart.

Album profile
The album was released by Don Arden on Decca after the group had made a switch to the Immediate label headed by Andrew Loog Oldham.  The album contains their hit records on Decca including their number one song "All or Nothing".  The album also includes a cover of Del Shannon's classic hit song "Runaway", and other previously unissued songs which were apparently demos. It features earlier versions of songs they re-recorded for Immediate, including "My Way Of Giving", which they had demoed for Chris Farlowe, and "(Tell Me) Have You Ever Seen Me?", which they had given to Apostolic Intervention. The album also featured their stage favourite "Baby Don't You Do It", featuring Jimmy Winston on lead vocals and guitar. The group's manager Don Arden sings the 'operatic prologue' to their cover of "Runaway".

Track listing
All tracks written by Steve Marriott and Ronnie Lane, unless otherwise noted.

(+ indicates that it was previously unissued)

Personnel
Steve Marriott – lead guitar (all tracks), lead (1–2, 5–9, 11–14) and backing vocals
Ronnie Lane – bass, backing and lead (3, 4) vocals
Kenney Jones – drums, percussion
Ian McLagan – keyboards/backing vocals (1–9, 11–13)
Jimmy Winston – keyboards/backing vocals (14), lead vocals/rhythm guitar (10)

Additional releases
1967 Format LP Label/Deram – Catalog #   4633
1967 Format LP Label/Decca – Catalog #   4879
1990 Format CD Label/Polygram – Catalog # 820766
1997 Format CD	Label/Deram – Catalog # 844633
1997 Format CD Label/PolyGram – Catalog # 820766
1997 Format CD Label/London Records – Catalog #820 766
1997 Format CD	Label/Polygram Intl. – Catalog # 844633
2006 Format CD Label/Universal/Polygram – Catalog #9069
2012 Format 2 CD Deluxe Edition Label/Universal/Sanctuary Records

See also
Small Faces discography

References

Further reading
Paolo Hewitt John Hellier (2004). Steve Marriott - All Too Beautiful....  Helter Skelter Publishing  .
Paolo Hewitt/Kenney Jones (1995) small faces the young mods' forgotten story – Acid Jazz

External links
The Small Faces Official Site
The Small Faces – Room For Ravers
The Darlings of Wapping Wharf Laundrette
Official Steve Marriott Site

Small Faces albums
1967 compilation albums
Decca Records compilation albums
Albums produced by Steve Marriott
Albums produced by Ronnie Lane
Albums produced by Ian Samwell
Deram Records compilation albums
PolyGram compilation albums
London Records compilation albums
Albums recorded at IBC Studios